The  is a DC electric multiple unit (EMU) train type operated on local services by East Japan Railway Company (JR East) in Japan since 1995, and also by the third-sector railway operator Echigo Tokimeki Railway since March 2015 as the ET127 series. The design is derived from the 209 series commuter EMU.

Variants
 E127-0 series: 13 x 2-car sets built for the Niigata area (originally used on Echigo Line, Hakushin Line, Uetsu Main Line)
 E127-100 series: 12 x 2-car sets for Matsumoto area (Oito Line, Shinonoi Line)
 ET127 series: 10 x former E127-0 series 2-car sets operated by Echigo Tokimeki Railway (ETR) since March 2015

All types use the same DT61A motor bogies and TR246A trailer bogies found on the 701 series EMUs.

Operations

, E127 series train sets are used on the following lines.
 E127-100 series
 Oito Line ( – )
 Shinetsu Main Line/Shinonoi Line ( – )
 Chuo Main Line (Shiojiri – , Shiojiri –  – )
 ET127 series
 Myoko Haneuma Line
 Shinetsu Main Line ( – )

Former operations

 E127-0 series (until March 2015)
 Shinetsu Main Line (Nagaoka – Niigata)
 Hakushin Line
 Uetsu Main Line ( – )
 E127-0 series (until March 2022)
 Yahiko Line
 Echigo Line ( – )

Future operations
 E127-0 series 
 Nambu Line ( – )

E127-0 series
Thirteen 2-car sets were built by Kawasaki Heavy Industries and Tokyu Car, and delivered to Niigata Depot in March 1995 (sets V1 to V6) and November 1996 (sets V7 to V13) for use on Echigo Line, Hakushin Line, and Uetsu Main Line local services. They entered service on 8 May 1995.

The sets can be coupled to form a six-car formation at maximum, and can be used on wanman driver only operation services.

On 14 March 2015, ten E127-0 series train sets were transferred to the third-sector railway operating company Echigo Tokimeki Railway for use on the renamed Myoko Haneuma Line and reclassified as ET127 series. Set V3 was withdrawn from service in October 2014, leaving just two sets, V12 and V13, in the ownership of JR East. These two sets were used mainly on Yahiko Line and Echigo Line services until March 2022. From 29 June of that year, however, the sets provisionally re-entered service on the Joetsu Line to compensate for train shortages brought on by a lightning strike that damaged five E129 series sets.

Formation
, two 2-car sets, V12 and V13, are in operation, based at Niigata Depot, formed as shown below, with one motored "Mc" car and one non-powered trailer "Tc" car.

 The KuMoHa E127 car has one PS30 cross-arm type pantograph.
 The KuHa E126 car has a toilet and wheelchair space.

E127-100 series

Twelve 2-car sets were built by Kawasaki Heavy Industries, JR East (Tsuchizaki Factory), and Tokyu Car, and delivered to Matsumoto Depot in November and December 1998 for use on Ōito Line and Shinonoi Line local services. They entered service on 8 December 1998. The external styling differs from the earlier E127-0 series, resembling the 701 series design. Sets A7 to A12 have a second de-icing pantograph on the KuHa trailer car.

Formation
, twelve 2-car sets (A1 to A12) based at Matsumoto Depot, are in operation, and formed as shown below, with one motored "Mc" car and one non-powered trailer "Tc" car, and car 1 at the Matsumoto end.

 Car 1 has one PS34 single-arm pantograph. (Also on car 2 for sets A7 to A12.)
 Car 2 has a toilet and wheelchair space.

Interior

ET127 series

From 14 March 2015, ten former JR East E127-0 series train sets were transferred to the third-sector railway operating company Echigo Tokimeki Railway for use on the renamed Myoko Haneuma Line, which was a section of the original Shin'etsu Main Line. The train sets were reclassified as ET127 series.

Formation
, Echigo Tokimeki Railway operates ten ET127 series two-car train sets, numbered from V1 to V10. The train sets are based at Naoetsu Depot. 

One train set is configured to have one motored "Mc" car coupled with one non-powered trailer "Tc" car, as shown below: 

 The ET127 car has one cross-arm type pantograph.

Build histories
The build histories of individual sets are as follows

E127-0 series

E127-100 series

References

External links

 JR East E127 series 

Electric multiple units of Japan
East Japan Railway Company
Train-related introductions in 1995
Kawasaki multiple units
Tokyu Car multiple units
1500 V DC multiple units of Japan